George W. Hewlett High School (also known as Hewlett High School, or HHS, and replacing Woodmere High School) is a four-year public high school in Hewlett Bay Park, New York, United States. Located in the Five Towns area of Long Island, it is the only high school in the Hewlett-Woodmere Union Free School District (District 14).

Demographics 
As of the 2018–19 school year, the school had an enrollment of 1,039 students and 96.6 classroom teachers (on an FTE basis), for a student–teacher ratio of 10.8:1. There were 212 students (20.4% of enrollment) eligible for free lunch and 37 (3.6% of students) eligible for reduced-cost lunch.

Academics
George W. Hewlett High School is a National Academy of Music Arts and Sciences school and is one of three Nassau County Districts "that is certified as a CISCO CCNA Academy".

Hewlett High School frequently earns recognition for its top-tier science research department, directed by Dr. Terrence Bissoondial. Under the mentorship of Dr. Bissoondial, Hewlett students frequently compete and excel in competitions such as the Regneron International Science and Engineering Fair, Regeneron STS, and Junior Science and Humanities Symposium.

Other Hewlett-sponsored activities that achieve national recognition include DECA, Hewlett History and Quiz Bowl, and women's tennis. Hewlett is known for its strong music program, with students regularly being selected for All-State and All-Eastern ensembles.

Notable alumni
Many of Hewlett High School's more distinguished alumni have been recognized by plaques on the school's walls that name them as members of the school's Alumni Hall of Fame. The following are among the school's notable former students:

 Ross Bleckner (1967) – artist
 Brian Burns – Emmy-nominated writer and producer, Entourage, Blue Bloods, and Daddy's Home
 Edward Burns (1986) – actor, producer, writer, and director
 Howard Deutch – director of several hit movies, married to actress Lea Thompson
 Jimmy Diresta (1985) – television personality, Dirty Money
 John DiResta (1982) – comedian
 Debbie Drimmer – VP of Talent, Comedy Central
 Meredith Eaton – actress known for Boston Legal and NCIS
 Gordon Edelstein (1972) – artistic director of the Long Wharf Theatre in New Haven, Connecticut
 Jane Friedman – President and CEO, HarperCollins; named on Vanity Fairs list of 200 Women Legends, Leaders and Trailblazers
 Jeffrey M. Friedman (1971) – scientist
 Lisa Glasberg (AKA Lisa G.) (1974) – NYC radio DJ
 Barbara Gaines (1975) – Late Night with David Letterman Emmy Award–winning producer
 Jordan Gelber (1993) – film, TV and Broadway actor
 Rande Gerber (1980) – nightclub owner, married to Cindy Crawford
 Brent Glass (1965) – director of the Smithsonian National Museum of American History
 Louise Glück (1961) – poet, Nobel Prize in Literature in 2020, Pulitzer Prize for Poetry in 1993, United States Poet Laureate 2003-04
 Larry "Melrose Larry Green" Greenblatt
 Carolyn Gusoff (1980) – news anchor/reporter WNBC Channel 4, NYC
 David M. Israel (1980) – TV producer and writer
 Donna Karan (1966) – fashion designer
 Peter Keisler (1977) – Supreme Court law clerk and former acting Attorney General of the United States
 Tony Kornheiser (1965) – sportscaster/sportswriter, ESPN's Pardon the Interruption
 Matthew Laurance – actor (Mel Silver on Beverly Hills 90210), sideline analyst on the Duke Radio Network
 Gwen Marcus (1974) – Executive Vice President and General Counsel, Showtime
 Bruce Murray (1981) – radio sportscaster
Brian Raider producer
 Modi Rosenfeld (1988) – comedian, actor
 Seth Rudetsky – Emmy Award–winning writer at The Rosie O'Donnell Show, musician, radio personality
 Lisa Schwarzbaum – movie critic
 Max Seibald (2005) – player for Long Island Lizards of Major League Lacrosse and Philadelphia Wings of National Lacrosse League
 Neal Simon (1986) – CEO of Bronfman Rothschild
 Dr. Joe Sobel (1963) – meteorologist, AccuWeather
 Jim Steinman (1965) – musical producer, known for collaboration with Meat Loaf and Bonnie Tyler
 Jonathan Tiomkin (1997) – Olympic athlete (fencing), member of gold-medal 2003 Pan Am Games team; silver medalist individually; 2003 and 1999 U.S. national champion
 Van Toffler (1976) – president of Viacom's Music & Logo Group, including MTV and VH1
 Stuart Weitzman (1958) – shoe designer
 Alan Zweibel (1968) – screenwriter and comedy writer, Saturday Night Live

References

External links
 

Public high schools in New York (state)
Schools in Nassau County, New York

Educational institutions established in 1995